The Michelob Championship at Kingsmill was a golf tournament on the PGA Tour from 1968 to 2002. It was played in Virginia at the River Course of Kingsmill Golf Club outside of Williamsburg, from 1981 to 2002.  From 1977 through 1995, it was known as the Anheuser-Busch Golf Classic.

The event was founded in 1968 as the Kaiser International Open Invitational, which was played in northern California at Silverado Country Club in Napa through 1980. In its second year, it was played twice. At the second edition in January 1969, three days of rain washed out the final two rounds of play and 36-hole leader Miller Barber was declared the winner, but only half the prize money was distributed. The tournament was rescheduled for late October/early November and Jack Nicklaus was the winner in a four-man playoff, decided on the second extra hole on Monday.

The purse of the inaugural event in 1968 was $125,000, and Kermit Zarley took the winner's share of $25,000 in January for his first  The final event in 2002 had a purse of $3.7 million, with a winner's share of $666,000 to Charles Howell III in early October.

From 2003 to 2009, an LPGA Tour event, the Michelob ULTRA Open at Kingsmill, was played at the same location. In 2012, the LPGA Tour event returned, renamed the Kingsmill Championship.

Tournament highlights
1968: Kermit Zarley shot a final round 65 (–7) to win $25,000 at the inaugural event, a stroke ahead of Dave Marr.
January 1969: For the first time ever, due to three days of steady rain a 72-hole PGA Tour tourney is called off after only 36 holes. Miller Barber was the winner by one shot over Bruce Devlin. The purse was also cut in half.  
November 1969: The Kaiser International is decided in a four-way playoff. Jack Nicklaus sank a   birdie putt on the second extra hole to defeat George Archer and Billy Casper. Don January was eliminated on the first playoff hole, as the others made birdies. Darkness then caused play to be called until Monday morning, which had a fog delay.
1970: Ken Still makes a birdie on the first playoff hole to defeat Lee Trevino and Bert Yancey. Dave Hill misses the playoff by one shot after making a triple bogey on the 11th hole during the final round of play. Just before his disastrous hole, Hill and his playing partner Chi-Chi Rodríguez exchanged angry words which required an official to settle their clash.
1974: Johnny Miller collects his 8th triumph of the year and wins by eight shots over Casper and Trevino.
1975: Miller successfully defends his Kaiser title and finishes three shots ahead of Rod Curl.
1976: J. C. Snead foils Miller's attempt to win three straight at Kaiser; Snead shoots a final round 68 to finish two shots ahead of Miller and Gibby Gilbert.
1977: Miller Barber wins in Napa again, with a final round 65 to rally from six shots back and defeat George Archer by two shots.  
1979: John Fought birdies the 72nd hole to win by one shot over Alan Tapie, Bobby Wadkins, and Buddy Gardner. It was Fought's second straight win on the PGA Tour. 
1981: John Mahaffey wins the first edition in Virginia, two strokes ahead of Andy North.
1983: Calvin Peete rallies from six shots back to successfully defend his Anheuser-Busch title, one shot in front of Tim Norris. Hal Sutton squandered the large lead, but wins the PGA Championship two weeks later.
1984: Ronnie Black, seven shots behind when final round play began, shoots a 63 to win by one shot over Willie Wood.
1986: Fuzzy Zoeller has a final round 64 to win by two shots over Jodie Mudd. 
1992: David Peoples bogeys the final two holes, but wins by one shot over Ed Dougherty, Jim Gallagher, and Bill Britton.
1996: Scott Hoch sets the 72-hole scoring mark at 265 (–19), with a four-shot victory over Tom Purtzer in July.
1997: David Duval, a future top-ranked player in the world and British Open champion, gains his first tour victory; he birdied the first playoff hole to defeat Grant Waite and Duffy Waldorf in mid-October.
1998: Duval successfully defends his Michelob title, three shots ahead of Phil Tataurangi.
1999: Tour rookie Notah Begay III notches his second victory in a playoff with Tom Byrum.
2001: David Toms, winner of the PGA Championship, successfully defends his Michelob title, one shot ahead of Kirk Triplett. 
2002: Charles Howell III attains his first tour win and takes $666,000 at the final edition, two shots ahead of Brandt Jobe and Scott Hoch.

Winners

Notes

References

External links
Tournament results (1970-2002) at GolfObserver.com
2002 Tournament preview - at GolfToday.co.uk

Former PGA Tour events
Golf in Virginia
Golf in California
Sports in Hampton Roads
1968 establishments in Virginia
2002 disestablishments in Virginia